Three destroyers of Japan have borne the name Kikuzuki or Kikutsuki:

 , a  launched in 1907 and stricken in 1930
 , a  launched in 1926 and sunk in 1942
 , a  launched in 1967 and decommissioned in 2003

Imperial Japanese Navy ship names
Japanese Navy ship names